Iseler is a mountain of Bavaria, Germany, near Bad Hindelang and Oberjoch.

The summit is accessible via hiking paths and the Salewa-Klettersteig, a via ferrata which starts at the upper station of the lift.

References 

Mountains of Bavaria
Allgäu Alps
Mountains of the Alps